The 2011 Victorian Premier League (known as the Alanic Premier League for sponsorship reasons) was the ninety-ninth season of the Victorian Premier League since the first season in 1909. The home and away season began 15 February 2011 and concluded 7 August 2011. Green Gully were the defending champions.

The concept of a youth development squad was reintroduced in 2010 with the National Training Centre team playing in midweek fixtures throughout the season but not for competition points. In 2011 the team, mostly comprising players from the Melbourne Victory youth squad, was renamed Victorian Training Centre Football and was eligible to score competition points for its matches but ineligible to qualify for the finals series or be relegated.

Green Gully won the double, winning both the premiership and the  Grand Final, defeating Oakleigh Cannons. Green Gully surpassed South Melbourne FC and Brunswick Juventus as the club with the most Victorian championships with nine in total.

Teams 
 Bentleigh Greens
 Dandenong Thunder SC
 Green Gully
 Heidelberg United
 Hume City FC
 Melbourne Knights
 Northcote City
 Oakleigh Cannons
 Richmond SC
 South Melbourne FC
 Springvale White Eagles
 St Albans Saints
 VTC Football

Promotion and relegation 

Teams promoted from Victorian State League Division 1:
(After the end of the 2010 season.)

 St Albans Saints (champions)
 Springvale White Eagles (runners-up)

Teams relegated to Victorian State League Division 1:
(After the end of the 2010 season.)

 Altona Magic (11th)
 Sunshine George Cross (12th)

Regular season
The Victorian Premier League 2011 season was played over 22 rounds, concluding on 7 August 2011, followed by the final series.

Finals

Finals Week 1

Finals Week 2

Finals Week 3

Grand Final

Top goalscorers

See also
Victorian Premier League
Football Federation Victoria

References

Victorian Premier League seasons
Victorian Premier League, 2011
2011 domestic association football leagues